At Newport '63 is an album by the jazz vocalese group Lambert, Hendricks & Bavan recorded at the 1963 Newport Jazz Festival. The album features the group who had re-formed in 1963 featuring Dave Lambert and Jon Hendricks, with Yolande Bavan replacing Annie Ross who had left the group in 1962.

The album was reissued in 1999 as part of RCA Victor's Classic Edition series, which featured improved audio quality and original cover art.

Reception

Billboard reviewed At Newport '63 upon its release in their 16 November 1963 issue, calling the album "A wild performance indeed."

Scott Yanow, writing on AllMusic said of the album: "Highlights include 'One O'Clock Jump,' 'Watermelon Man,' 'Cloudburst' and a funny rendition of Hendricks' 'Gimme That Wine.' All of the records by this group (and its predecessor Lambert, Hendricks and Ross) are well worth acquiring even if Yolande Bavan was not a soloist on the level of an Annie Ross."

This performance of 'Yeh-Yeh' inspried the 1964 hit single by British vocalist Georgie Fame.

C. Andrew Hovan, writing for All About Jazz said that the album "...proves to be a rhapsodic moment captured on tape that at the time provided evidence that the loss of Annie Ross was anything but the demise of the group. Sure, Bavan didn't have the range that Ross did, but she was more than able to keep up with her two gentleman friends and add a different tonal color to the group to boot! ...Terry and Hawkins sound inspired and Mahones and the trio provide the kind of spunky support that spurs on such performances". Hovan also described pianist Gildo Mahones as "tragically underrated" and trumpeter Clark Terry as sounding "tart and tasty" on "Sack O' Woe".

Track listing 
 "Watermelon Man" (Herbie Hancock, Jon Hendricks, Big Mama Thornton) – 4:45
 "Sack O' Woe" (Cannonball Adderley, Nat Adderley, Hendricks) – 3:38
 "One O'Clock Jump" (Count Basie) – 2:42
 "Deedle-Lee Deedle-Lum" – 5:24
 "Gimme That Wine" (Hendricks) – 3:18
 "Yeh, Yeh" (Rodgers Grant, Hendricks, Pat Patrick) – 5:59
 "Walkin'" (Richard Carpenter, Hendricks) – 8:43
 "Cloudburst" (Carpenter, Hendricks, Leroy Kirkland) – 2:12
 "Bye Bye Blackbird" (Mort Dixon, Ray Henderson) – 5:40

Personnel
Dave Lambert, Jon Hendricks, Yolande Bavan  – vocals
Coleman Hawkins – tenor saxophone 
Clark Terry – flugelhorn, trumpet
Gildo Mahones – piano
George Tucker – double bass
Jimmie Smith – drums

Production
Janet DeMatteis – artwork  
Griffin Norman – design  
Mickey Crofford – engineer
George Avakian – liner notes, producer
Chuck Stewart – photography
James P. Nichols – reissue producer
Joshua Sherman – series coordinator
Steve Gates – series producer

References 

1963 live albums
Albums produced by George Avakian
Albums recorded at the Newport Jazz Festival
Lambert, Hendricks & Ross albums
RCA Records live albums
Live vocal jazz albums